Tim is a novel by Australian writer Colleen McCullough, published by Harper and Row in 1974. Her literary agent was Frieda Fishbein.

It portrays the story of the developing relationship between an older, middle-class woman, Mary Horton, who lives on her own and a handsome, developmentally impaired 24-year-old gardener, Tim Melville, whom she hires. 
It inspired the 1979 film of the same name, starring Piper Laurie and Mel Gibson and the 1996 film Mary & Tim starring Candice Bergen and Tom McCarthy.

References

1974 Australian novels
Australian novels adapted into films
Novels by Colleen McCullough
Novels set in Australia
Harper & Row books